In mathematics, more specifically, in convex geometry, the mixed volume is a way to associate a non-negative number to an  of convex bodies in  space. This number depends on the size and shape of the bodies and on their relative orientation to each other.

Definition

where  stands for the -dimensional volume and its argument is the Minkowski sum of the scaled convex bodies . One can show that  is a homogeneous polynomial of degree , therefore it can be written as

where the functions  are symmetric.

Properties

 The mixed volume is uniquely determined by the following three properties:
 ;
  is symmetric in its arguments;

 The Alexandrov–Fenchel inequality, discovered by Aleksandr Danilovich Aleksandrov and Werner Fenchel:

Numerous geometric inequalities, such as the Brunn–Minkowski inequality for convex bodies and Minkowski's first inequality, are special cases of the Alexandrov–Fenchel inequality.

Quermassintegrals

Let  be a convex body and let  be the Euclidean ball of unit radius. The mixed volume

The definition of mixed volume yields the Steiner formula (named after Jakob Steiner):

Intrinsic volumes

 or in other words 

where  is the volume of the -dimensional unit ball.

Hadwiger's characterization theorem

Notes

External links

Convex geometry
Integral geometry